The 29th Golden Disc Awards ceremony was held on January 14–15, 2015, at the MasterCard Center in Beijing, China. It was the third time the event had been hosted outside South Korea, following ceremonies in Japan in 2012 and Malaysia in 2013. Kim Sung-joo, Kim Jong-kook and Fei served as hosts on the first day, with Jun Hyun-moo, Leeteuk and Tiffany on the second.

Winners and nominees

Main awards
Winners and nominees are listed in alphabetical order. Winners are listed first and emphasized in bold.

Special awards

Controversy
Due to visa issues, several artists were unable to perform onstage during the ceremony, including members of Beast, Got7 and BTS. The organisers apologised for the error afterwards. The show also drew criticism for not being broadcast live in South Korea, with only a recorded version available on JTBC; the sole livestream was hosted on Chinese video platform iQiyi.

References

2015 in South Korean music
2015 music awards
Golden Disc Awards ceremonies